Pitcher House , also known as Fullinwider House,  was a historic home located at Mount Vernon, Posey County, Indiana.  It was built in 1867, and was a two-story, Federal / Greek Revival style painted brick dwelling. It featured a full-width front porch. It has been demolished.

It was listed on the National Register of Historic Places in 1980 and delisted in 1989.

References

Former National Register of Historic Places in Indiana
Houses on the National Register of Historic Places in Indiana
Houses completed in 1867
Federal architecture in Indiana
Greek Revival houses in Indiana
Houses in Posey County, Indiana
National Register of Historic Places in Posey County, Indiana